Les Murray (27 September 1928 – 27 May 1999) was  an Australian rules footballer who played with Footscray in the Victorian Football League (VFL).

Notes

External links 		
		
		
		
		
		
		
		
1928 births		
1999 deaths		
Australian rules footballers from Victoria (Australia)		
Western Bulldogs players